Paul Jackson,   is well known for his large-scale works.  His studio, The Avalanche Ranch, is in Columbia, Missouri. Jackson was inducted as a signature member into the American Watercolor Society at the age of 30, and he is a signature member of the National Watercolor Society. His work has received top honors in national and international competition.

Awards and honors

An abbreviated list of some awards and honors include:
 Walser Greathouse Medal – American Watercolor Society
 Best of Show – Northwest Watercolor Society National Exhibition
 Winsor & Newton Award – National Watercolor Society
 Designed the White House Easter Egg (x 3)
 Designed Missouri's Commemorative State Quarter
 Created "Spot," a 30' diameter tiger mosaic & led more than a thousand volunteers in its 420,000 tile construction at the University of Missouri, Columbia
 Invited to the Invitational Exhibition of Contemporary International Watermedia Masters in China
 In 2009 Paul served as the invited juror for the American Watercolor Society's 142nd annual international exhibition.
 Paul was also the only American artist invited to the International Art Meet in Kolkata, India in 2011
 2014 Invited instructor for Istanbul Watercolor Society, Istanbul, Turkey
 Created Bright Lights of Budapest, Paul's largest watercolor to date, a 5x10-foot commissioned watercolor work now in a private collection.

Tiger Spot 
Paul Jackson's Tiger Spot was completed and unveiled in October 2001 but the mosaic began to show signs of wear that were likely due to weather. A consultant concluded the mosaic was not built properly. The mosaic was covered by a circular tarp in 2007 and the University of Missouri-Columbia spent $112,508.63 attempting to sustain it. Jackson sued the University in 2011. The lawsuit settled in 2012 with Jackson receiving $125,000 to dismiss the litigation.

Books
 Painting Spectacular Light Effects in Watercolor
  The Wandering Watercolorist

References

Sources
 
 Local watercolor artist invited to exhibit in China. Columbia Daily Tribune.
 Watercolor winners named at CAL show. Columbia Daily Tribune.
 Artist to give mosaic of tiger to university. Columbia Daily Tribune.
 Studio of Dreams - Paul Jackson has opened a gallery in Columbia.... Columbia Daily Tribune.

External links
 Official web site
 Biography
 Curriculum Vitae

21st-century American painters
21st-century American male artists
American watercolorists
People from Lawrence, Kansas
Living people
Mississippi State University alumni
University of Missouri alumni
Artists from Columbia, Missouri
Painters from Missouri
American male painters
1968 births